La calandria may refer to:

 La calandria (play), a comedy play by Bernardo Dovizi da Bibbiena 
 La calandria (1933 film), a 1933 Mexican film
 La calandria (1972 film), a 1972 Italian comedy film directed by Pasquale Festa Campanile